The Roman Catholic Diocese of Neuve de Julio is a Catholic diocese located in the city of Nueve de Julio, Buenos Aires Province.  It is in the Ecclesiastical province of Mercedes-Luján in Argentina, 
having had change of metropolitan from La Plata in 2019.

History
On 11 February 1957, Pope Pius XII established the Diocese of Neuve de Julio from the Diocese of Azul and the Diocese of Mercedes.

Bishops

Ordinaries
Agustin Adolfo Herrera (1957–1961), appointed Coadjutor Bishop of Jujuy
Antonio Quarracino (1962–1968), appointed Coadjutor Bishop of Jujuy; future Cardinal
Alejo Benedicto Gilligan (1969–1991) 
Jose Vittorio Tommasi (1991–1998) 
Martin de Elizalde, O.S.B. (1999–2015)
Ariel Edgardo Torrado Mosconi (2015–Present)

Coadjutor bishop
Ariel Edgardo Torrado Mosconi (2015)

References

Neuve de Julio
Neuve de Julio
Neuve de Julio
Neuve de Julio